Mountain Creek is an unincorporated community in southeastern Chilton County, Alabama, United States.

Confederate Memorial Park
Mountain Creek was the site of the Alabama Confederate Soldiers Home from 1902 to 1939, which is now the Confederate Memorial Park. The  park has a museum, research facility, historic structures, ruins and two cemeteries with the graves of over 300 Confederate soldiers.

References

Unincorporated communities in Alabama
Unincorporated communities in Chilton County, Alabama
Birmingham metropolitan area, Alabama